Rome, a dramatic television series created by John Milius, William J. MacDonald and Bruno Heller, premiered on 28 August 2005 on the HBO Network in the United States and ended on 25 March 2007, after 2 seasons and a total of 22 episodes.

Rome is a historical drama depicting the period of history surrounding the violent transformation of the Roman Republic into the Roman Empire; a change driven by civil warfare between radical populares and conservative optimates, the decay of political institutions, and the actions of ambitious men and women.

The first and second seasons of Rome were released on DVD in the U.S. in 2006 and 2007, respectively; and Blu-ray versions were released in 2011. A complete series box set with additional features was released in 2009, on both DVD and Blu-ray.

Series overview

Episodes

Season 1 (2005)

Season 2 (2007)

References

External links

Lists of American drama television series episodes
Lists of British drama television series episodes